Zsolt Bácskai (born 8 April 1975) is a Hungarian long-distance runner. He competed in the men's marathon at the 2004 Summer Olympics.

References

1975 births
Living people
Athletes (track and field) at the 2004 Summer Olympics
Hungarian male long-distance runners
Hungarian male marathon runners
Olympic athletes of Hungary
Place of birth missing (living people)
20th-century Hungarian people